Yersinia aldovae is a species of bacteria that was originally described as Group X2 Yersinia enterocolitica. Its type strain is CNY 6005 (= CDC 669-83 = ATCC 35236). Y. aldovae has been isolated from aquatic environments and soil, but it has not been associated with animal or human illnesses.

Etymology
N.L. gen. fem. n. aldovae, of Aldova, named in honor of Eva Aldova, the Czechoslovakian microbiologist who first isolated the bacterium.

References

Further reading

External links
LSPN lpsn.dsmz.de

Type strain of Yersinia aldovae at BacDive -  the Bacterial Diversity Metadatabase

aldovae
Bacteria described in 1984